Nikola Mektić and Ivan Zovko were the defending champions, but decided not to participate.
Aljaž Bedene and Grega Žemlja won the title, defeating Roberto Bautista-Agut and Ivan Navarro 6–3, 6–7(10–12), [12–10] in the final.

Seeds

Draw

Draw

References
 Main Draw PDF

BMW Ljubljana Open - Doubles
BMW Ljubljana Open